Hasanbegović is a surname. Notable people with the surname include:

Envera Hasanbegović (born 1996), Bosnian footballer
Jado Hasanbegović (born 1948), Yugoslav footballer
Marijana Mišković-Hasanbegović (born 1982), Croatian judoka
Melisa Hasanbegović (born 1995), Bosnian footballer
Mirza Hasanbegovic (born 2001), Swedish-born Bosnian footballer
Nedim Hasanbegović (born 1988), German footballer
Nela Hasanbegović (born 1984), Bosnia and Herzegovina sculptor
Zlatko Hasanbegović (born 1973), Croatian politician and historian

Bosnian surnames